Víctor Manzanilla Schaffer (13 November 1924 – 7 April 2019) was a Mexican politician and diplomat who served as Governor of the state of Yucatán. He was a member of the Institutional Revolutionary Party (PRI).

Early life and education
Manzanilla Schaffer was the son of a revolutionary politician in Yucatán, the founder of the Anti-Reelection Party and a congressman. He earned an undergraduate degree from the School of Law of the National Autonomous University of Mexico, a master's degree in sociology from The New School for Social Research in New York, and a doctorate in law.

Career
He served as a legal assistant in the United Nations division of narcotics, as Mexico's ambassador to China and its first to North Korea, and for two terms as a member of the Senate and one as a member of the Chamber of Deputies. He exerted unusual independence as a congressman, on one occasion voting against President José López Portillo's amendment of Article 27 of the Constitution. Elected to succeed Víctor Cervera Pacheco, he was governor of Yucatán from February 1988 to February 1991, when he resigned three years before his term was to have ended, it is presumed at the urging of Cervera Pacheco and of then-President Carlos Salinas de Gortari.

Honours
Among other honours Manzanilla Schaffer was awarded the Medalla al Mérito Legislativo, the Knight Commander's Cross of the Grand Cross of Merit of the Order of Merit of the Federal Republic of Germany, and the Jesús Reyes Heroles prize of the Agrupación Nacional de Egresados del Instituto de Capacitación Política of the PRI.

References

1924 births
2019 deaths
Presidents of the Chamber of Deputies (Mexico)
Presidents of the Senate of the Republic (Mexico)
Governors of Yucatán (state)
Ambassadors of Mexico to China
Ambassadors of Mexico to North Korea
Knights Commander of the Order of Merit of the Federal Republic of Germany